Soper is a town in Choctaw County, Oklahoma, United States. The population was 261 at the 2010 census. The town was named for Pliny L. Soper, who was an attorney for the Arkansas and Choctaw Railway.

History 
At the time of its founding, Soper was located in Kiamitia County, one of the constituent counties comprising the Apukshunnubbee District of the Choctaw Nation.

Geography
Soper is located in west-central Choctaw County at  (34.033385, -95.696573).

Soper has a volunteer fire department, local gas station and market, and several prominent families who have been in the area for many years.

Demographics

As of the census of 2000, there were 600 people, 432 households, and 74 families residing in the town. There were 159 housing units at an average density of 631.7 per square mile (245.6/km2). The racial makeup of the town was 74.33% White, 19.33% Native American, and 6.33% from two or more races. Hispanic or Latino of any race were 0.67% of the population.

There were 132 households, out of which 29.5% had children under the age of 18, 40.2% were married couples living together, 15.2% had a female householder with no husband present, and 43.2% were nonfamilies. Of all households 41.7% were made up of individuals, and 25.0% had someone living alone who was 65 years of age or older. The average household size was 2.27, and the average family size was 3.13.

In the town, the population was spread out, with 28.3% under the age of 18, 8.3% from 18 to 24, 24.0% from 25 to 44, 20.3% from 45 to 64, and 19.0%  65 years of age or older. The median age was 36 years. For every 100 females age 18 and over, there were 73.4 males.

The median income for a household in the town was $13,875, and the median income for a family was $18,333. Males had a median income of $16,875 versus $16,000 for females. The per capita income for the town was $7,814. About 35.1% of families and 44.4% of the population were below the poverty line, including 41.5% of those under the age of 18 and 50.8% of those 65 or over.

Education
Surrounding smaller communities in the area include Buckhorn, Bluff, Gay, Nelson, and Sugar Creek, most of which were small school districts, many of which still stand today, before they were closed and the students began using the Soper public school system.

The Soper High School baseball team has been in the state tournament many times, since debuting and placing runner-up in the fall of 1992, and finally winning the state championship in the spring of 2009.

Notable people
Ray Wylie Hubbard, Texas country singer and songwriter
Freckles Brown, born Warren Granger Brown, rodeo performer known for riding the "unrideable" bull Tornado in 1967, owned and lived on a ranch near Soper.

References

Towns in Oklahoma
Towns in Choctaw County, Oklahoma